Martin Riley may refer to:

Martin Riley (basketball) (born 1954), former Canadian basketball player
Martin Riley (cricketer) (1851–1899), Yorkshire cricketer
Martin Riley (footballer) (born 1988), English professional football defender